John Dunn (14 June 1878 – 30 June 1963) was an Australian rules footballer who played with Collingwood in the Victorian Football League (VFL).

Notes

External links 

Johnny Dunn's profile at Collingwood Forever

1878 births
1963 deaths
Australian rules footballers from Victoria (Australia)
Collingwood Football Club players